Tillandsia heubergeri is a species in the genus Tillandsia. This species is endemic to Brazil.

References

heubergeri
Flora of Brazil